Mazorakopf or Falknishorn (2451.5 m) is a mountain on the border between Switzerland and Liechtenstein. It is the southernmost point of the principality of Liechtenstein.

Mountains of Liechtenstein
Mountains of Switzerland
Mountains of Graubünden
Liechtenstein–Switzerland border
International mountains of Europe
Mountains of the Alps
Two-thousanders of Switzerland
Maienfeld
Fläsch
Triesen